Tamworth Enterprise College (formerly Belgrave High School) is a coeducational secondary school with academy status in Tamworth, Staffordshire, England, which pupils attend from the ages of 11 to 16 years old.

The school was founded with just one building called "The same  year Block" in 1978, and in 1981 added the "E Block" for its additional pupils. The school canteen was originally placed in the White Block but was later moved to a more central location within the school. The area that was occupied by the old canteen is now used for classroom teaching. Since then, the school canteen has been extended, with a new purpose-built extension added beside the existing kitchen area. Which has a 2 star hygiene rating.

The school's headteacher is Mr Jon Spears. The schools is sponsored by the Academies Enterprise Trust.

The Governmental department Ofsted gave Belgrave a grade 2 "good" rating in their 2009 inspection; however, it was judged in 2011 as not satisfactory before being graded as requires improvement in the summer of 2004.

Notable former pupils

Belgrave High School
 X Factor 2010 finalist Treyc Cohen
 Bristol and Wales International footballer Ashley Williams.
 Sunday Times bestselling author Gillian McAllister

References

Secondary schools in Staffordshire
Academies in Staffordshire
Educational institutions established in 1978
1978 establishments in England
Academies Enterprise Trust
Schools in Tamworth, Staffordshire